Cyprus competed at the 2000 Summer Olympics in Sydney, Australia.

Results by event

Athletics

Men
Track & road events

Field events

Combined events – Decathlon

Women
Field events

Sailing

Two men from Cyprus competed in two Sailing events in the 2000 Olympics.

Shooting

Swimming

Men

Women

External links
Cyprus Olympic Committee-Cyprus in 2000 Olympics

References
Wallechinsky, David (2004). The Complete Book of the Summer Olympics (Athens 2004 Edition). Toronto, Canada. . 
International Olympic Committee (2001). The Results. Retrieved 12 November 2005.
Sydney Organising Committee for the Olympic Games (2001). Official Report of the XXVII Olympiad Volume 1: Preparing for the Games. Retrieved 20 November 2005.
Sydney Organising Committee for the Olympic Games (2001). Official Report of the XXVII Olympiad Volume 2: Celebrating the Games. Retrieved 20 November 2005.
Sydney Organising Committee for the Olympic Games (2001). The Results. Retrieved 20 November 2005.
International Olympic Committee Web Site

Nations at the 2000 Summer Olympics
2000
O